Cheviot Hills Military Academy operated from 1946 until 1952 as a K through 9th grade military school. Founded by Frank J. Brick on the premises of the old Pacific Military Academy in Culver City, California, the school ran under the auspices of the California Cadet Corps.

During its short life, the school averaged approximately 150 students spread among the 10 grades. Most of them boarded in the main building but there was a small contingent of daily commuters. Military style uniforms were required of all students while on the grounds and military structure dictated the daily routines such as marching to classes, meals, recess and daily inspections.  From reveille to taps, a bugle announced the task at hand.

This Florentine structure, designed by noted architect Wallace Neff, was originally built in 1929 as the Pacific Military Academy by Culver City Founder, Harry Culver. At the beginning of World War II, the building served as military barracks for the Army's First Motion Picture Unit. This Army unit used the Hal Roach Studios also located in Culver City.  There is film footage still in existence which shows young officer Ronald Reagan lined up for lunch at the cafeteria in the basement of the main building.

In 1952 the property at 9601 Cattaraugus Ave. was sold to a Catholic order, the Marianists (Society of Mary) to become Chaminade High School For Boys.  In 1959, the address was changed to its back street, Beverly Drive.  In 1962, Chaminade Preparatory, as it is now known, moved to what is now West Hills in the San Fernando Valley, and, after sale to developers, the grand old building was demolished to make way for residential homes.   Beverly Drive was extended through the center of the property down to Cattaraugus Avenue.  Today, only four palm trees remain, as found now in the back yards of homes along Beverly Drive.

In the top picture with the main building at the center, the laundry and staff residences are on the left, the horse corrals in the center and the athletic field house on the right. The classrooms were located in a single story building behind the main structure. They can be seen in the right side of the inspection picture.

The site is bordered by Cattaraugus on the south, Castle Heights on the west, Beverlywood on the north and S. Beverly Drive on the east. The main building stood on Beverlywood Street just west of S. Beverly Dr. The northern property line is now the northern property line of the homes bordering the north side of Beverlywood.

References

Sources
 1951–1952 CHMA Hilltop School Annuals
 History of Culver City, California
 History of Pacific Military Academy
 History of Chaminade High School

External links

 Cheviot Hills Military Academy
 F.M.P.U. homepage

Military academies of the United States
Defunct United States military academies
Educational institutions established in 1946
1952 disestablishments in California
Defunct schools in California
First Motion Picture Unit
1946 establishments in California